Lieutenant-Colonel Thomas Brereton (1782–1832) was an officer of the British Army.

Career

He was descended from Sir William Brereton, Chief Justice and Lord High Marshal of Ireland, from the ancient and noble family of Brereton, Cheshire, England. Born in King's County (now County Offaly), Ireland, in 1782. 1798 he received his commission as an ensign in the 8th West India Regiment. 1809 he was promoted to Major and served at the capture of Martinique from the French and Guadelope the following year. He was appointed brigade major in 1813 for his relative Major General Robert Brereton, Lieutenant-Governor of St. Lucia. 1814 he was appointed Lieutenant-Governor of Senegal and Gorée and was present during the  tragedy. 1815 he was promoted to Lieutenant-Colonel of the Royal African Corps. 1819 he was appointed to the command of the Cape Town garrison until 1823 when he retired to England to become Inspecting Field Officer for the Bristol recruiting district.

At the time of the 1831 Reform riots in Bristol he was in charge of the troops. The riots started on the Saturday and lasted for three days and though Colonel Brereton only lost control on the Sunday due to lack of troops he still managed to put down the rioting early on Monday morning before the arrival of the reinforcements he had requested. Despite this, he was controversially court-martialled in January 1832, during which he committed suicide. Twice a widower he died leaving four children.

Depictions in film
The 1978 children's paranormal TV drama The Clifton House Mystery was a ghost story based on the circumstances of Brereton's death. The plot revolved around a family moving into an old house in Bristol that finds a long-dead skeleton in a hidden room. After some unexplained incidents, they become convinced that a ghost connected in some way with the Bristol Riots of 1831 is haunting the house. After checking local records, they realize that it is the ghost of a dragoon commander who was court-martialled for his handling of the riots, and who later disappeared without a trace. The ghost is named "George Bretherton" in the TV series. One of his descendants, named "Mrs Betterton", had sold the house to the family, but was allegedly unaware of the hidden room and its contents, referring only to a vague family scandal that happened generations ago.

Depictions in fiction
Colonel Brereton forms part of the early narrative of The Passage to India, Allan Mallinson's novel, Transworld Publishers, 2019. ISBN 9780857503794

References

The Readeption of Colonel Brereton, John Brereton

External links
 
  (Catalogue ref: PRO HO 40/28)

1782 births
1832 deaths
19th century in Bristol
British military personnel who committed suicide
Suicides by firearm in England
West India Regiment officers
British colonial army officers
People from County Offaly
49th Regiment of Foot officers
King's Shropshire Light Infantry officers
Thomas
Suicides in Bristol